The National Bighorn Sheep Interpretive Center is a  Interpretive Center dedicated to public education about the biology and habitat of the Rocky Mountain Bighorn Sheep with specific focus on the currently largest herd of Rocky Mountain Bighorn sheep in the coterminous United States that winter in the Whisky Basin of Whisky Mountain adjacent to the Fitzpatrick Wilderness in the Shoshone National Forest. The Center preserves and interprets the relationships of the Bighorn sheep and is located in the town of Dubois, Wyoming on U.S. Route 26 along the Wyoming Centennial Scenic Byway. The museum offers interpretive programs, exhibits, multi-media presentations, and special events.

Exhibits
The center contains several permanent exhibits.

 The Natural History of the Bighorn sheep featuring displays including the geology of the Wind River, the flora and fauna including the native cutthroat trout and bighorn sheep
 The Mountain Shoshone, known as the Sheepeaters, and how they lived as interpreted from the steatite tools, horn bows crafted from bighorn sheep horn, and petroglyphs left from ancestors  
 The role of creative conservation to create and preserve habitat.

See also
 Dubois Museum

Notes

External links
National Bighorn Sheep Interpretive Center - official site

Dubois, Wyoming
Museums in Fremont County, Wyoming
Natural history museums in Wyoming
1993 establishments in Wyoming